Avraam I. Isayev (born 1942)  University of Akron Distinguished Professor of Polymer Science known for widely used texts on rheology and polymer molding technology, as well as for development of technology for ultrasonic devulcanization of tire rubber.

Education 

Isayev was born in Azerbaijan and is a US citizen. He earned two master's degrees, the first in Chemical Engineering from Azerbaijan Institute of Oil and Chemistry in Baku (USSR) in 1964, and a second in Applied Mathematics from the Institute of Electronic Machine Building in Moscow (USSR) in 1975.  He completed a doctorate in Polymer Engineering and Science at the Institute of Petrochemical Synthesis of the Academy of Sciences of the USSR in Moscow in 1970.

Career 

Isayev began his career in 1970 at the Institute of Petrochemical Synthesis of the Academy of Sciences in Moscow. In 1977, he joined the Israel Institute of Technology in Israel.  He joined Cornell University in 1979. He joined the Polymer Engineering department at the University of Akron in 1983.  He has been a visiting professor at Kyoto University, University of Aachen, and the University of Linz.  During the period from 1990 to 2009 he was the director of Molding Technology Research and Development Center (MOLDTECH). He is the Editor-in-Chief of the journal Advances in Polymer Technology.

Awards

 Society Plastics Engineers (SPE) Fellow 
 OMNOVA Solutions Signature University Award from the OMNOVA Solutions Foundation
 1996 Outstanding Researcher Award from the University of Akron
 1999 Melvin Mooney Distinguished Technology Award from Rubber Division of the ACS
 George Stafford Whitby Award from Rubber Division of the ACS
 Silver Medal from the Institute of Materials (London)
 1999 Vinogradov Prize from the G. V. Vinogradov Society of Rheology (Moscow)
 NorTech Award given by Crain Publishers
 James L. White Award of Polymer Processing Society 
 SPE International Award

References 

1942 births
Polymer scientists and engineers
20th-century American engineers
Azerbaijan State Oil and Industry University alumni
Living people
University of Akron faculty